Khvajeh Askar (also Romanized as Khvājeh ‘Askar; also known as Khājeh Asgar, Khvājeh ‘Asgar, and Khvājehī Askar) is a village in Howmeh Rural District, in the Central District of Bam County, Kerman Province, Iran. At the 2006 census, its population was 1,592, in 439 families.

References 

Populated places in Bam County